The Great Southern and Western Railway (GS&WR) Class 333 consistent of eight 4-4-0 mixed-traffic locomotives designed by Robert Coey and built by Inchicore railway works in 1907/8. In 1936, the successor company - the Great Southern Railways (GSR) - built five similar engines known as GSR Class 342.

Design and modifications
The design used the same taper boiler and 18 in x 20 in cylinders as Coey's express 4-4-0 express passenger engine 321; however, the smaller driving wheels and less than 16 long ton maximum axle load were suitable for go anywhere and secondary passenger and mixed duties.

The later Class 342 locomotives were essentially modeled on the 1927 rebuild of locomotive No. 338 of the 333 Class.

Service
In practice, all members of these classed were treated interchangeably for operational purposes. A  maximum axle load allowed the class to be used almost anywhere. They were assessed in 1948 as quite powerful and fast and especially useful for passenger specials.

Loan to GNRI
In 1946, No. 346 (which was an oil burner at the time) was lent to the Great Northern Railway (GNRI) to operate the Dublin-Bundoran express as far as Dundalk.

References

4-4-0 locomotives
5 ft 3 in gauge locomotives
Steam locomotives of Ireland
Railway locomotives introduced in 1908
Scrapped locomotives